Wild Boy is a 1934 British comedy sports film directed by Albert de Courville and starring Sonnie Hale, Bud Flanagan and Chesney Allen. It was by Gainsborough Pictures at Lime Grove Studios. The sets were designed by Alfred Junge. Often forgotten, but the role of "Wild Boy" was played by the greyhound Mick the Miller.

Premise
This film is a caper story of greyhound racing and the efforts of a crooked dog owner to stop a rival's dog, Wild Boy, from running in the Greyhound Derby. Allmovie shows a different synopsis.

Cast
 Sonnie Hale as Billy Grosvenor  
 Gwyneth Lloyd as Marjorie Warren 
 Bud Flanagan as Dick Smith 
 Chesney Allen as Auctioneer and Bookmaker  
 Lyn Harding as Frank Redfern  
 Leonora Corbett as Gladys Scrivener  
 Ronald Squire as Rollo  
 Fred Kitchen as Joe Plumer  
 Arthur Sinclair as P. Murphy  
 Cyril Smith as Kennel Boy
 Mick the Miller as Wild Boy

References

Bibliography
 Low, Rachael. Filmmaking in 1930s Britain. George Allen & Unwin, 1985.
 Wood, Linda. British Films, 1927-1939. British Film Institute, 1986.

External links
 
 
 

1934 films
1930s sports comedy films
British crime comedy films
British sports comedy films
British black-and-white films
Gainsborough Pictures films
Films directed by Albert de Courville
1930s crime comedy films
Films set in England
Films shot at Lime Grove Studios
Films and television featuring Greyhound racing
1934 comedy films
Greyhound racing films
1930s English-language films
1930s British films